For the start of the tournament each team were allowed 23 players within their squad. Players birthdays should be correct as of October 31, 2008 which was the start of the tournament.

Group A

Japan

Head coach:  Tatsuya Makiuchi

Saudi Arabia
Head coach:  Nelson

Iran

Yemen
Head coach: Abdullah Mohammed Fodel.

Group B

United Arab Emirates

South Korea

Head coach:  Cho Dong-Hyun

Iraq

Head coach: Hakim Shaker

Syria

Group C

China PR
Head Coach: Liu Chunming

North Korea

Tajikistan

Lebanon
Head Coach:  Samir Saad

|-

|}

Group D

Australia

Uzbekistan
The following players were called for AFC U-19 Championship 2008 in Saudi Arabia

Thailand

Jordan
Head coach:  Ahmed Abdel-Qader

References

External links
 Details on AFC.com

Squads